Black Water Gold is a 1970 American made-for-television adventure drama film starring Keir Dullea, Bradford Dillman, France Nuyen, Aron Kincaid, and Ricardo Montalban. It was aired on January 6, 1970 in the ABC Movie of the Week space.

Cast
 Keir Dullea as Christofer Perdeger
 Bradford Dillman as Lyle Fawcet	
 France Nuyen as Thais
 Aron Kincaid as Ray Sandage
 Ricardo Montalban as Alejandro Zayas
 Lana Wood as Eagan Ryan
 Jacques Aubuchon as Kefalos
 Paul Hampton as Roger
 Stuart Tyrone as Jason

References

External links

1970 television films
1970 films
1970s English-language films
ABC Movie of the Week
1970s adventure films
Films scored by Jerry Styner